East Branch Mohawk River is a river in Lewis County and Oneida County in the U.S. state of New York. It begins south of the hamlet of Mohawk Hill, flows through the hamlet of West Leyden and empties into Mohawk River east of the hamlet of West Branch.

References

Rivers of New York (state)
Rivers of Oneida County, New York
Rivers of Lewis County, New York